The Americas Zone is one of the three zones of regional Davis Cup competition in 2015.

In the Americas Zone there are three different groups in which teams compete against each other to advance to the next group.

Participating nations

Seeds:
 
 
 
 

Remaining nations:

Draw

 and  relegated to Group III in 2016.
 promoted to Group I in 2016.

First round

Venezuela vs. Costa Rica

Puerto Rico vs. El Salvador

Mexico vs. Bolivia

Chile vs. Peru

Second round

Venezuela vs. El Salvador

Chile vs. Mexico

Play-offs

Puerto Rico vs. Costa Rica

Peru vs. Bolivia

Third round

Chile vs. Venezuela

References
 Draw

Davis Cup Americas Zone
2015 Davis Cup Americas Zone